Mountain bike racing (shortened MTB or ATB racing) is the competitive cycle sport discipline of mountain biking held on off-road terrain. The Union Cycliste Internationale (UCI) recognised the discipline relatively late in 1990, when it sanctioned the world championships in Durango, Colorado. The first UCI Mountain Bike World Cup series took place in 1988. Its nine-race circuit covered two continents—Europe and North America—and was sponsored by Grundig. Cross-country racing was the only World Cup sport at this time. In 1993, a six-event downhill World Cup was introduced. In 1996, cross-country mountain biking events were added to the Olympic Games. In 2006, cross-country mountain biking events became part of the World Deaf Cycling Championships for the first time in San Francisco, USA.

In the United States, there are three USA Cycling Mountain Bike National Calendars: Endurance, Gravity and Ultra-Endurance. USA Cycling runs the USA Cycling Mountain Bike National Championships.  There are mountain bike racing types that are not recognized by the UCI, such as mountain bike orienteering that is governed by the IOF.

History
Mountain bike racing is as old as the first appearance of the mountain bike itself, when the originators, calling themselves klunkers, descended with their heavily modified beach cruiser bikes as predecessors of modern mountain bikes from numerous mountains in California against a rudimentary time measurement. The famous Repack racing down-hill against the time near Fairfax, Marin County, CA took place in 1976.

The oldest organised cross-country (XC) racing-like event, however, is believed to take place from Crested Butte to Aspen in Colorado in 1978. It took 10 years before the UCI recognised racing on mountain bikes as a regular cycling discipline in 1990. In the meantime, the phenomenon of mountain bike racing spread across the U.S.A. under the umbrella of NORBA.

The most plausible, although still speculative reason, was an early resemblance of the racing courses for mountain bikes with the cyclo-cross discipline, with a major difference: the mountain bike racing track was significantly longer (a cyclo-cross course has 2.5–3.5 km versus 4+ km for a XC track) and free of artificial obstacles. With the rapid advancement of mountain bike gear, namely stronger brakes and suspension, the mountain bike racing could take place on even more technical tracks making it more dissimilar to the cyclo-cross discipline.

Mountain bike racing became an Olympic discipline in 1996 and a cross-country type mountain biking race has been held ever since its debut at the summer Olympic games in Atlanta. Given the enormous variation of terrain a mountain bike can navigate, a division took place as a cause of riders' specialisation.

Types

 Cross-country – Cross-country (XC) racing is held on a varied terrain circuit, it is normally around 6–8 kilometers (km) and is always a massed-start race. Under the 2006 UCI rules, elite, U23, and Junior Expert riders at UCI sanctioned races, are allowed technical assistance, but only in designated zones and only by an authorized team mechanic. However, riders in the same team can help each other at any point in the race. Under NORBA rules, no technical assistance is allowed. Professional level races are longer in distance, around 50 km.
Cross-country olympic (XCO)
 Short Track Cross-Country – Short track cross country (STXC) is a very short XC style event of about 800 m in length but generally about 1 minute 30 seconds in winning time. A short, sharp exciting event to watch and participate in. Also called Cross-country eliminator

 Downhill – Downhill (DH) racing is a time trial event. Riders start at intervals that can vary from 30 seconds to three minutes-depending on the stage of the competition – and the rider with the lowest time wins. As the name of this discipline implies, DH races are held in steep, downhill terrain, resulting in higher speed than in cross-country racing. The terrain is also significantly rougher than in cross-country racing. The bike is designed with long travel suspension and hydraulic disc brakes.
 Super D – Super D (SD) is a blend of cross-country and downhill. Most of the race is downhill, on trails similar to the downhill segment of a cross-country race. There are also short (100–500m) uphill sections which make the use of downhill bicycles difficult, as a result, most riders use cross-country or 'trail bikes'. Depending on the trail and race venue, the start may either be seeded (riders start in short intervals), or Le Mans mass start (riders run to their bikes, timing is started when the riders start running). Probably the most famous of this type is the Megavalanche.
 Freeride – Freeride (FR) competitions are not so much a race as they are a competition of skill and style. Courses contain varying cliffs, drops, obstacles, and ramps. There are usually a large number of ways in which to complete the course, and scoring is dependent on the competitor's choice of routes, the fluidity of riding and tricks performed (style), and sometimes also the time in which the course is completed.
 Dual Slalom/Dual – Dual Slalom (DS) is a ski-inspired event which pits two riders against each other on two identical man-made tracks side by side with the same jumps and berms, with a rider on each track, and the first across the line wins. The contest has a knock-out format. Dual (DL) events are similar, only two riders share the same course/track. So dual is a contact sport.
 Four cross – (4X, also known as 'mountain cross' or 'bikercross') inspired by the dual format and by BMX racing, this event pits four riders on the same course from starting gates to finish. There can only be one winner per event, so the races can quickly eliminate riders making the progression faster for a day's events. This is the reason it was chosen as the race-format to replace Dual-Slalom by the UCI at World Cup events. 4X also replaced Dual in the UCI World Cup series in 2002. There is a difference between 4X and mountain cross. In 4X, riders are each given a run down the course which is timed and the top 50% of the field then progress to the elimination rounds. In mountain cross, riders are given three heats against three other riders, and points are allocated for your position in each heat. Again, the top 50% progress to the elimination rounds. 4X is the format raced in world cup however mountain cross is the preferred format for amateur races.
Eliminator – Cross-country eliminator (XCE)
 Marathon – Marathon (XCM) is perhaps the toughest form of mountain biking because riders often have to cover more than 80 km in one race on mountainous terrain. The distances usually vary from 60 km to 100 km.  Races often exceed 100 km, but are then termed Ultra-Marathons.  Recently UCI has inaugurated the Marathon World Cup. Basically it equals point-to-point (PP) discipline and that means that riders have a mass start from point "A" and they finish at point "B".
 Enduro – Enduro in its most basic definition is a type of mountain bike racing where the downhills are timed, and the uphills are not. Riders are timed in stages that are primarily downhill, with neutral "transfer" stages in between. The transfer stages usually must be completed within a time-limit, but are not part of the accumulated time. The winner is the rider who accumulates the lowest combined time from the timed downhill sections. Enduros typically take place over one or two days, but week-long competitions also exist. A typical one-day enduro consists of 3 to 5 timed stages which take place on technically demanding, generally descending terrain, often with sections of singletrack.

 Stage Races (XTS) – Stage Races consist of several races – 'stages' – ridden consecutively, usually over a period of several days. A stage is usually similar in length and structure to a Marathon mountain bike race. The competitor with the lowest cumulative time to complete all the stages is declared the overall, or General Classification (GC), winner. Stage races may also have other classifications and awards, such as individual stage winners.
 Bike trials – Slow negotiation of man-made and natural obstacles where setting a foot down constitutes a penalty.
 Dirt jumping – Dirt jumping (DJ), similar to freeride, it is a competition of skill, differing that it involves the rider to jump off mounds of dirt to perform the best tricks with the best style. It differs to freeriding that the jumps are usually much larger and designed to lift the rider higher into the air and the bicycle is different from its counterpart.
 Mountain bike orienteering (MTB-O or MTBO) is an orienteering sport on a mountain bike where navigation is done along trails and tracks. The major focus becomes route choice while navigating at bike speed. Special equipment used is a map holder attached to the handlebar of the bike. The sport is governed by International Orienteering Federation.
 24 hour mountain bike races are a form of endurance mountain bike racing where solo competitors or teams race for a period of 24 hours and standings are based on who has ridden the furthest distance in that time (typically, the most number of laps around a loop).

Notable events
The main events in mountain bike racing are the cross-country event at the Summer Olympics and the World Championships and World Cup organized every year by the UCI at various venues around the World.

There are also other notable events in some countries, like Crankworx, a week-long event in Whistler, British Columbia, Canada; MTB Himalaya in India; Chupacabras, a race in Juárez, Mexico; The Nedbank Tour de Tuli in South Africa, Zimbabwe and Botswana, Cape Epic in South Africa; Sea Otter Classic in the United States; Mountain Mayhem in the United Kingdom and La Ruta de los Conquistadores in Costa Rica.

The International Triathlon Union conducts an annual Cross Triathlon Championship race annually. Additionally, the XTERRA Triathlon is a private off-road series and concluding with a championship each year in Maui.

Electric bicycle races include Enduro World Series's EWS-E, Union Cycliste Internationale's E-Mountain Bike Cross-country World Cup and Fédération Internationale de Motocyclisme's E-Xbike World Cup.

See also
Cycling
Mountain biking
Downhill mountain biking
Enduro (mountain biking)
Bicycle Motocross
Single track (mountain biking)
Bunny hop (cycling)
Cyclo-cross
Mountain bike
Glossary of cycling

References

External links
 International Mountain Bicycling Association
 National Off-Road Bicycling Association (NORBA), USA
 Union Cycliste Internationale, Mountain Biking
 Mountain Biking Races Calendar

Cycle racing by discipline
Summer Olympic disciplines
Cycle racing